There have been at least two instances of poisonings due to consumption bootleg alcohol in West Bengal. In December 2011, 167 people died in West Bengal after consuming it. In September 2015, alcohol poisoning led to the deaths by methanol poisoning of 15 people in West Bengal in India.

References

See also 
List of alcohol poisonings in India

Crime in West Bengal
Alcohol-related deaths in India